The National Union Government was a form of national government that governed the Grand Duchy of Luxembourg between 1945 and 13 February 1947, in the direct aftermath of the Second World War.  During the war, Luxembourg was invaded, occupied, and annexed by Nazi Germany.  Just one of the Luxembourgish casualties of the conflict was the pre-war political system; most of the established parties and alliances disappeared, and some of the leading politicians had lost their lives.

Background
After the liberation of the Grand Duchy in 1944, a temporary government comprising the CSV and the LSAP, dubbed the  'Liberation Government' , took office.  No election had been held and no Chamber of Deputies was in place, so there was no need for this government to seek a broad-based legislative coalition.

However, after the war was concluded, Luxembourg returned to political functionality.  Legislative elections were held on 21 October 1945, and all four parties won over 5 seats and 10% of the vote each: the CSV, LSAP, GD, and KPL.  However, the CSV came just short of an absolute majority, winning 25 seats out of 51.

Forming the government
Atypically, Grand Duchess Charlotte decided to intervene in the political sphere, and asked CSV leader Pierre Dupong (who had been Prime Minister since 1937) to form a broader based coalition than Dupong had organised behind his Liberation Government.  On 14 November, Dupong invited all four parties in the Chamber of Deputies to unite in his National Union Government.  Dupong also included the only independent candidate in the cabinet.  As a result, all 51 Deputies were taking the government whip.

The new government had much work to do, and, with no opposition in the legislature, was capable of instituting any plan, provided that the parties could agree policy between themselves.  The departmental briefs were handed to cabinet members based upon personal preference.  The composition of the first cabinet was:

Governing the country
With each member virtually free to decide departmental policy by himself, each took it upon himself to push forward his own pet projects.  The CSV pushed for the annexation of those Luxembourgish territories lost to Prussia in the Napoleonic Wars.  The LSAP ordered the nationalisation of the railways.  The KPL sought to create a welfare state.  This system of reign by ministerial diktat was not without its draw-backs.

The arrangement distanced the government from the population, which was forced to accept the patchwork of policies, even though over 40% of Luxembourgers had cast their vote for the CSV.  Dupong had been revered as the leader of Luxembourg's government in exile, but his government was fomenting resentment.  On 2 August 1946, four officers were arrested for allegedly plotting to overthrow the government.  Although they were released without charge, it sent a clear message to the government.

Moreover, ideological differences were forcing the government partners apart.  The cabinet divided along ideological lines in exactly the manner that the National Union Government was supposed to prevent.  Dupong took exception to the LSAP's plans for the railways, whilst the KPL and LSAP attempted to distance themselves from the CSV's irredentism.

Charles Marx died on 13 June 1946 and was replaced by fellow Communist Party member Dominique Urbany eight days later.  In addition, on 29 August, the cabinet was reshuffled, with the independent Guillaume Konsbruck replaced by Lambert Schaus, a CSV member.  From that date, the cabinet was:

Gomand trial 
The Resistance-affiliated newspaper L'Indépendant, edited by Norbert Gomand, had been one of the sharpest critics of the government-in-exile. Finally, the government took the newspaper to court for defamation, in a trial starting in early 1946.

Collapse
The reshuffle, in favour of the CSV, appeased the right-wing dissidents and the two-fifths of the population that had voted the CSV.  However, it could not even paper over the cracks of the coalition, and the relationship deteriorated over the winter of 1946-7.  On 20 January 1947, Pierre Krier, the leader of the LSAP, died.  Unable to hold together the coalition without one of its leading lights, the government handed in its resignation on 13 February.  Its replacement was another Dupong-led coalition, but including only the CSV and GD.  The LSAP would have to wait until 1951 to have another chance at governing. As of 2021, the Communists are still waiting.

See also
 Liberation Government (Luxembourg)
 National Union Government (1916)

Footnotes

References
 

History of Luxembourg (1945–present)
Ministries of Luxembourg
20th century in Luxembourg
Coalition governments
1945 establishments in Luxembourg
1947 disestablishments in Luxembourg
Cabinets established in 1945
Cabinets disestablished in 1947
1940s in Luxembourg
1945 in Luxembourg
1946 in Luxembourg
1947 in Luxembourg